Cedric Wesley Isom (born June 6, 1984) is an American-Rwandan basketball player who last played for APR of the Rwanda National Basketball League.

Career
Born in Newton, Texas, he graduated from East Texas Baptist in 2006. Isom has played in Iceland, Rwanda, Angola, Portugal and the United Arab Emirates. He won the Angolan League championship in 2011 and 2016.

Isom started his career with Úrvalsdeild Karla club Þór Akureyri in 2007 and quickly became one of the leagues best players. He averaged 26.1 points, 7.0 rebounds and 5.5 assists during the regular season, helping Þór reach the playoffs. In the playoffs, Þór lost to eventual champions Keflavík in two games. He returned to Þór the following season but broke his hand in December 2008. After the injury did not heal as hoped, Isom was released in February 2009. 

In February 2010, Isom signed with Tindastóll for the rest of the season. He appeared in eight regular season games, averaging 28.6 points, 7.1 rebounds and 8.5 assists per game. He scored a season high 48 points against Snæfell on 4 March 2010. In the playoffs, he averaged 20.3 points, 6.7 rebounds and 7.3 assists per game in a 1-2 series loss against Keflavík.

In 2018, Isom signed in the United Arab Emirates with Al Jazeera.

In October 2020, Isom returned to APR in Rwanda for a second stint.

National team career
In 2013, Isom joined the Rwanda national basketball team to prepare for the AfroBasket 2013 tournament, however he was not included in the final roster.

Achievements
 2003-2006 3-time ASC East Division Player of the Year
 2011-2012 Africa Club Champion with 1º de Agosto
 2012-2013 BAI Basket champion with 1º de Agosto
 2012-2013 BAI Basket MVP with 1º de Agosto
 2013-2014 Africa Clubs Champions Cup MVP with 1º de Agosto

External links
Africabasket profile
Facebook profile
Úrvalsdeild stats at kki.is

References

1981 births
Living people
American expatriate basketball people in Angola
American expatriate basketball people in Iceland
American men's basketball players
Atlético Petróleos de Luanda basketball players
Basketball players from Texas
C.D. Primeiro de Agosto men's basketball players
East Texas Baptist Tigers men's basketball players
People from Newton, Texas
Shooting guards
Ungmennafélagið Tindastóll men's basketball players
Úrvalsdeild karla (basketball) players
Þór Akureyri men's basketball players
APR B.C. players